The 2013 Buffalo Bulls football team represented the University at Buffalo in the 2013 NCAA Division I FBS football season. They were led by fourth-year head coach Jeff Quinn and played their home games at University at Buffalo Stadium. They completed as a member of the East Division of the Mid-American Conference. They finished the season 8–5, 6–2 in MAC play to finish in second place in the East Division. They were invited to the Famous Idaho Potato Bowl, only the second bowl game in school history, where they were defeated by San Diego State.

Schedule

Source: Schedule

Game summaries

@ Ohio State

In their first game of the season, the Bulls lost, 40–20 to the Ohio State Buckeyes.

@ Baylor

In their second game of the season, the Bulls lost, 70–13 to the Baylor Bears.

Stony Brook

In their third game of the season, the Bulls won, 26–23, in 5 overtimes, over the Stony Brook Seawolves.

UConn

In their fourth game of the season, the Bulls won, 41–12 over the UConn Huskies.

Eastern Michigan

In their fifth game of the season, the Bulls won, 42–14 over the Eastern Michigan Eagles.

@ Western Michigan

In their sixth game of the season, the Bulls won, 33–0 over the Western Michigan Broncos.

Massachusetts

In their seventh game of the season, the Bulls won, 32–3 over the Massachusetts Minutemen.

@ Kent State

In their eighth game of the season, the Bulls won, 41–21 over the Kent State Golden Flashes.

Ohio

In their ninth game of the season, the Bulls won, 30–3 over the Ohio Bobcats.

@ Toledo

In their tenth game of the season, the Bulls lost, 51–41 to the Toledo Rockets.

@ Miami (OH)

In their eleventh game of the season, the Bulls won, 44–7 over the Miami RedHawks.

Bowling Green

In their twelfth game of the season, the Bulls lost, 24–7 to the Bowling Green Falcons. The game was promoted as the "Clash at the Ralph," returning college football to the 70,000+ seat Ralph Wilson Stadium for the first time since the 1970s. (The stadium was nowhere near filled to capacity, but ticket sales were roughly on par with the Bulls' games at UB Stadium.) Had the Bulls won this game, they would have qualified for the MAC Championship Game.

Famous Idaho Potato Bowl

In their thirteenth game of the season, the Bulls lost, 49–24 to the San Diego State Aztecs in the 2013 Famous Idaho Potato Bowl in Boise, Idaho.

Rankings

References

Buffalo
Buffalo Bulls football seasons
Buffalo Bulls football